At the Grave of Richard Wagner is a studio album by the Kronos Quartet, containing works by Alban Berg and Anton Webern, and a brief "romantic elegy" by Franz Liszt.

Track listing

Critical reception
According to Alan Artner, writing in the Chicago Tribune, "Few other recorded performances have had qualities of tone conveying as beautifully the scores' ripe, fibrillating atmosphere." Daniel Webster, in the Milwaukee Journal Sentinel, wrote that " In traditional repertoire, the Kronos Quartet has its own distinctive voice. It plays Liszt's romantic elegy, 'At the Grave of Richard Wagner,' with rich, dark sounds. The performance of Berg's 'String Quartet (Op. 3)' is precise and the quartet makes Webern's 'Five Pieces (Op 5). sound easy to play as the compositions seem to appear magically, shift color and vanish."

Personnel

Musicians
David Harrington – violin
John Sherba – violin
Hank Dutt – viola
Joan Jeanrenaud – cello
Aki Takahashi – piano
Marcella DeCray – harp

Production
Recorded at Skywalker Sound, Nicasio, California
Bob Edwards, Judith Sherman – Engineers
Craig Silvey – Assistant Engineer (tracks 1–3)
Tony Eckert – Assistant Engineer (tracks 4–8)

See also
List of 1993 albums

References 

1993 classical albums
Kronos Quartet albums
Nonesuch Records albums